Concierto mágico may refer to:

 Magic Concert, a Spanish musical film by Rafael J. Salvia
 Concierto mágico (Balada), a concerto for guitar by Spanish composer Leonardo Balada